The Best of Peter Green Splinter Group is a compilation album by the British blues band the Peter Green Splinter Group, led by Peter Green. Released in 2002, this was a two-disc set. Green was the founder of Fleetwood Mac and a member of that group from 1967–70, before a sporadic solo career during the late 1970s and early 1980s. This compilation was re-released in 2006.

A different single-disc compilation with the same title and similar packaging but with a different play list was issued in 2019.

There was also a similar compilation called The Very Best of Peter Green Splinter Group, issued in 2012 with a different tracklisting.

Track listing 2006 (2 CDs)

Disc 1
"Burglar" (Nigel Watson) – 5:58
"I'm a Steady Rollin Man" (Robert Johnson) – 3:34
"Big Change Is Gonna Come" (Roger Cotton) – 5:04
"Phonograph Blues" (Johnson) – 3:29
"Help Me" (Sonny Boy Williamson) – 4:40
"Sweet Home Chicago" (Johnson) – 4:17
"Hitch Hiking Woman" (Black Ace) – 3:48
"Tribal Dance" (Peter Green) – 5:32
"Homework" (Otis Rush) – 3:42
"Love in Vain Blues" (Johnson) – 4:48
"You'll Be Sorry Someday" (Cotton) – 6:34
"Look on Yonder Wall" (Johnson) – 6:09
"Traveling Riverside Blues" (Johnson) – 4:09
"Going Down" (Don Nix) – 6:29
"Hiding in Shadows" (Cotton) – 4:40

Disc 2
"Albatross" (Green) – 3:23
"The Green Manalishi" (Green) – 5:28
"Rattlesnake Shake" (Green) – 5:02
"The Supernatural" (Green) – 3:13
"Man of the World" (Green) – 3:05

Track listing 2012 (2 CDs)

Disc 1
	Look on Yonder Wall
	The Stumble
	Steady Rollin' Man
	It Takes Time
	When You Got a Good Friend
	Walkin' Blues
	Ramblin' on My Mind
	Me & The Devil Blues
	Sweet Home Chicago
	The Supernatural
	Shake Your Hips
	Last Fair Deal Gone Down
	If I Had Possession Over Judgment Day
	The Green Manalishi
	Big Change Is Gonna Come
	Heart of Stone

Disc 2
	Burglar
	Hiding in the Shadows
	Man of the World
	Dead Shrimp Blues
	Little Queen of Spades
	Hot Tamales and They're Red Hot
	Cross Road Blues
	Come On in My Kitchen
	Downsize Blues (Repossess My Body)
	Feeling Good
	Time Keeps Slipping Away
	Underway
	Ain't Nothin' Gonna Change It
	Look Out for Yourself
	Don't Walk Away
	I'm Ready for You

Track listing 2019 (1 CD)
	Heart of Stone		
	I'm a Steady Rollin' Man (Feat. Otis Rush)		
	Big Change Is Gonna Come		
	Homework		
	When You Got a Good Friend		
	You'll Be Sorry Someday		
	Phonograph Blues		
	Love in Vain Blues		
	Burglar		
	From Four Till Late (Feat. Dr. John)		
	Hiding in Shadows		
	Sweet Home Chicago (Feat. Paul Rodgers)		
	Hitch-hiking Woman		
	Me and the Devil Blues		
	Goin' Down		
	Man of the World		
	Albatross

Personnel
Peter Green – guitars, vocals, harmonica
Nigel Watson – guitars, vocals
Neil Murray – bass guitar
Pete Stroud – bass guitar
Spike Edney – keyboards
Roger Cotton – keyboards
Cozy Powell – drums
Larry Tolfree – drums

References

2002 albums
Peter Green Splinter Group albums